Monsieur Beaucaire is a 1924 American silent romantic historical drama film starring Rudolph Valentino in the title role, Bebe Daniels, and Lois Wilson. Produced and directed by Sidney Olcott, the film is based on Booth Tarkington's 1900 novel of the same name and the 1904 play of the same name by Tarkington and Evelyn Greenleaf Sutherland.

Plot
The Duke of Chartres is in love with Princess Henriette, but she seemingly wants nothing to do with him. Eventually he grows tired of her insults and flees to England when Louis XV insists that the two marry. He goes undercover as Monsieur Beaucaire, the barber of the French Ambassador, and finds that he enjoys the freedom of a commoner’s life. After catching the Duke of Winterset cheating at cards, he forces him to introduce him as a nobleman to Lady Mary, with whom he has become infatuated. When Lady Mary is led to believe that the Duke of Chartres is merely a barber she loses interest in him. She eventually learns that he is a nobleman after all and tries to win him back, but the Duke of Chartres opts to return to France and Princess Henriette who now returns his affection.

Cast

Production notes
Monsieur Beaucaire was produced by Famous Players-Lasky, directed by Sidney Olcott, and distributed by Paramount Pictures. It was filmed at Kaufman Astoria Studios in New York City.

For this film, whose action is set at the court of King Louis XV of France, the atmosphere is resolutely French and French-speaking. It is French dancer Paulette Duval's second American picture; the Belgian André Daven, playing the brother of Valentino's character, was hired for his resemblance to the Latin lover; the Nantes-based Georges Barbier designed the 350 costumes. The film's dialogues were written in French for more realism. Valentino speaks French, as do Bebe Daniels, Lowell Sherman and Sidney Olcott.

Reception
Monsieur Beaucaire was part of a series of box office and critical disappointments that plagued Valentino mid-career. Although the film did fairly well in big cities, it flopped in smaller locales, and could not exceed the expensive budget Olcott put into the film's production. Historians Kevin Brownlow and John Kobal suggested that the film's shortcomings stemmed more from Olcott's "pedestrian" direction.

Many viewers and critics, perhaps expecting the more virile Valentino of his earlier films, felt that his onscreen persona with its heavy makeup, frilled attire, and arch mannerisms (particularly in the first half) was overly feminized in Monsieur Beaucaire: a somewhat unfair accusation, considering that much of the film satirizes the excesses of the court of Louis XV.

Much of the blame for the film's alleged shortcomings was assigned to Valentino's wife Natacha Rambova who was felt by many of Valentino's colleagues to have had an undue influence on the costumes, set and direction of the film. Alicia Annas wrote that audiences were most likely alienated by the general design of the film which, while historically accurate, was not tailored to 1920s American filmgoers' tastes. The Stan Laurel parody Monsieur Don't Care (1924) reflected the general public attitude toward Monsieur Beaucaire.

Adaptations
The novel Monsieur Beaucaire was adapted into a musical film, Monte Carlo (1930), directed by Ernst Lubitsch. The story was filmed again as a comedy, directed by George Marshall and starring Bob Hope and Joan Caulfield, also called Monsieur Beaucaire (1946).

The 1951 biopic Valentino, produced by Columbia Pictures, directed by Lewis Allen with Anthony Dexter, includes a sequence dedicated to Monsieur Beaucaire.

A long sequence dedicated to Monsieur Beaucaire appears in the 1977 film Valentino (1977), directed by Ken Russell, with Rudolf Nureyev in the title role and John Justin in the role of Sidney Olcott.

References

External links

 
 
 Monsieur Beaucaire web site dedicated to Sidney Olcott 
Stills at silenthollywood.com
 

1924 films
1924 romantic drama films
1920s historical romance films
American black-and-white films
American romantic drama films
American silent feature films
Famous Players-Lasky films
Films based on works by Booth Tarkington
Films directed by Sidney Olcott
Films set in England
Films set in France
Films set in the 18th century
Films shot in New York City
Cultural depictions of Louis XV
Cultural depictions of Madame de Pompadour
American historical romance films
Films shot at Astoria Studios
Surviving American silent films
1920s American films
Silent romantic drama films
Silent American drama films
1920s English-language films
Silent historical romance films